The 1997–98 season was the 92nd season in the history of Olympique de Marseille and the club's second consecutive season in the top flight of French football. In addition to the domestic league, Marseille participated in this season's editions of the Coupe de France and the Coupe de la Ligue.

Players

First-team squad
Squad at end of season

Left club during season

Competitions

Division 1

League table

Results summary

Results by round

Matches

Coupe de France

Coupe de la Ligue

References

Olympique de Marseille seasons
Marseille